Clooney Gaels are a Gaelic Athletic Association hurling club based in Clooney (Cloney) outside Ahoghill, County Antrim, Northern Ireland. This team's catchment area is Ahoghill, Clooney, Portglenone and Moneyglass.

"The Gaels" did well in the Junior Hurling Championship in 2006/7, winning the County Antrim Junior Hurling Championship, Ulster Junior Hurling Championship and playing their way to the All-Ireland Junior Hurling Championship before being defeated by Danesfort (Kilkenny).

Roll of honour

Hurling
2013   Ulster Intermediate Club Hurling Championship Winners
2013   Antrim Intermediate Hurling Championship Winners
2007	All-Ireland Junior Club Hurling Championship Finalists
2006	Ulster Junior Club Hurling Championship Winners
2005	Antrim All County Div 3 Hurling League Winners, Ulster Hurling League Div 3 Winners, Barcelona Gaels Inaugural Hurling Tournament Winners
2000	Antrim All County Div 4 Hurling League Winners
1998	South West Antrim Hurling Championship
1997	South West Antrim Hurling Championship
1992	South West Antrim Hurling Championship
1990	All Ireland Junior Hurling seven-a-side Ulster Representatives
1989	Antrim Junior Hurling Championship, South West Antrim Hurling League
1988	North Antrim Junior Hurling League, South West Antrim Hurling Championship
1984	South West Antrim Hurling League
1982	South West Antrim Hurling Championship

References

External links
Clooney Gaels GAA Club website

Hurling clubs in County Antrim
Gaelic games clubs in County Antrim